The following lists events that happened during 1933 in Australia.

Incumbents

Monarch – George V
Governor-General – Sir Isaac Isaacs
Prime Minister – Joseph Lyons
Chief Justice – Frank Gavan Duffy

State Premiers
Premier of New South Wales – Bertram Stevens
Premier of Queensland – William Forgan Smith
Premier of South Australia – Lionel Hill (until 13 February), then Robert Richards (until 18 April), then Richard L. Butler
Premier of Tasmania – John McPhee
Premier of Victoria – Sir Stanley Argyle
Premier of Western Australia – James Mitchell (until 24 April), then Philip Collier

State Governors
Governor of New South Wales – Sir Philip Game
Governor of Queensland – Sir Leslie Orme Wilson
Governor of South Australia – Sir Alexander Hore-Ruthven
Governor of Tasmania – Sir Ernest Clark (from 4 August)
Governor of Victoria – none appointed
Governor of Western Australia – none appointed

Events
8 April – A referendum is held in Western Australia, which is carried 2 to 1 in favour of secession from the Commonwealth of Australia.
26 April – The seaplane carrier, is paid off into reserve.
10 June – The Australian Women's Weekly is first published.
13 June – The Australian Antarctic Territory is established.
28 August – The Brisbane newspaper, The Courier-Mail, is first published.
5 September – Australia signs a trade agreement with New Zealand.
6 September – Windscreen wipers become compulsory on all Australian cars.
13 October – The first traffic lights in Sydney become operational at the intersection of Kent and Market Streets.

Arts and literature

 Charles Wheeler wins the Archibald Prize with his portrait of Ambrose Pratt
 Blinky Bill: The Quaint Little Australian, the first Blinky Bill book is published by children's author Dorothy Wall

Film
 Errol Flynn makes his first film appearance, In the Wake of the Bounty, directed by Charles Chauvel

Sport
 9 September – The 1933 NSWRFL season culminates in Newtown's 18–5 victory against St. George in the premiership final. Western Suburbs finish in last place, claiming the "wooden spoon".
 Hall Mark wins the Melbourne Cup
 New South Wales wins the Sheffield Shield
 England defeats Australia 4–1 in The Ashes series

Births
 2 January – Ed Casey (died 2006), banker and politician
 23 January – Bill Hayden, Governor-General of Australia (1989–1996)
 29 January – Rosemary Adey, softball player (died 2013)
 12 February – Brian Carlson (died 1987), rugby league footballer
 20 March – Ian Walsh (died 2013), rugby league footballer and coach
 15 April – David Martin (died 1990), Governor of New South Wales (1989–1990)
 27 May – Michael Crouch (died 2018), investor, water boiler manufacturer 
 13 July – Kel O'Shea (died 2015), rugby league footballer
 25 July – Owen Abrahams (died 2006), Australian rules footballer
 27 July – Ted Whitten (died 1995), Australian rules footballer 
19 August – Patricia Kailis (died 2020), businesswoman, neurologist and geneticist
 30 August – Keith Payne, soldier
 15 September – Monica Maughan (died 2010), actress
 3 October – Neale Fraser, tennis player
 5 October – Diane Cilento (died 2011), actress
 11 October – Gary O'Callaghan (died 2017), radio personality
 1 December – James Wolfensohn (died 2020), President of the World Bank
 5 December – Harry Holgate (died 1997), Premier of Tasmania (1991–1992)
 20 December – Ted Mack (died 2018), politician
 26 December – Ugly Dave Gray, television personality

Deaths
 7 January –  Bert Hinkler, aviation pioneer (died in Italy) (b. 1892)
 9 January – Daphne Akhurst, tennis player (b. 1903)
 10 January – Richard Buzacott, Western Australian politician (b. 1867)
 17 January – John Hodges, cricketer (born in the United Kingdom) (b. 1855)
 5 February – Josiah Thomas, New South Wales politician (born in the United Kingdom) (b. 1863)
 16 February – Archie Jackson, cricketer (born in the United Kingdom) (b. 1909)
 21 March – James Edmond, journalist (born in the United Kingdom) (b. 1859)
 15 April – Alfred Stephens, writer and literary critic (b. 1865)
 20 April – Sir William Rooke Creswell, 1st Naval Officer Commanding the Commonwealth Naval Forces (born in Gibraltar) (b. 1852)
 30 April – Robert Hamilton Russell, surgeon (born in the United Kingdom) (b. 1860)
 4 June – Herbert Basedow, South Australian politician, anthropologist, geologist and explorer (b. 1881)
 22 June – Harold Desbrowe-Annear, architect (b. 1865)
 20 July – William Lowrie, agricultural educationist (b. 1857)
 26 July – Sir Joseph Verco, physician and conchologist (b. 1851)
 10 August – Alf Morgans, 4th Premier of Western Australia (born in the United Kingdom) (b. 1850)
 7 October – Sir Alexander Peacock, 20th Premier of Victoria (b. 1861)
 15 November – Affie Jarvis, cricketer (b. 1860)
 19 November – Hugo Throssell, soldier and Victoria Cross recipient (b. 1884)

See also
 List of Australian films of the 1930s

References

 
Australia
Years of the 20th century in Australia